Margaret Ruth Ensign Lewis (1919 – November 2017) was an American botanist, taxonomist, and professor specializing in California flora.

The International Plant Names Index lists 38 plant names published by Margaret Ruth Ensign.

Publications

References

1919 births
2017 deaths
Botanists active in California
20th-century American botanists
Date of birth unknown
Pomona College alumni